Frankenstein and the Monster From Hell is a 1974 British horror film, directed by Terence Fisher and produced by Hammer Film Productions. It stars Peter Cushing, Shane Briant and David Prowse. Filmed at Elstree Studios in 1972 but not released until 1974, it was the final chapter in the Hammer Frankenstein saga of films as well as director Fisher's last film.

The film was released on U.K. DVD+Blu-ray on 28 April 2014, with all previously censored scenes restored to the film.

Plot
Baron Victor Frankenstein, having survived the fire at the end of the previous film, lives and works in an insane asylum as a surgeon and is given a number of privileges, as he holds incriminating evidence on Adolf Klauss, the asylum's corrupt and perverted director. Frankenstein, using the alias of Dr. Carl Victor, uses his position to continue his experiments in the creation of man.

When Simon Helder, a young doctor and an admirer of Frankenstein's work, arrives as an inmate for the crimes of ‘sorcery’ and body-snatching, the Baron is impressed by Helder's talents and takes him under his wing as an apprentice. Together they work on the design for a new creature. Unknown to Simon, however, Frankenstein is acquiring body parts by murdering his patients.

Frankenstein's new experiment is the hulking, ape-like Herr Schneider, a homicidal inmate whom he has kept alive after a violent suicide attempt and on whom he has grafted the hands of a recently deceased sculptor. Since Frankenstein's hands were badly burned in the fire, all shabby stitchwork must be done by Sarah, a beautiful mute girl who assists the doctor, and who is nicknamed "Angel". Simon tells Frankenstein that he is a surgeon and the problem is solved. Frankenstein reveals that Sarah is Klauss' daughter and has been mute ever since he tried to rape her.

Soon new eyes and a new brain are given to the creature. When The Monster – lumbering, hirsute and mute – is complete, it becomes bitter and intent on revenge. It ultimately embarks on a killing spree in the asylum, with Klauss as one of his victims. Eventually, it is fully overpowered and destroyed by a mob of inmates. Simon is devastated by the loss of life and reports to Frankenstein; however, the Baron feels that it was the best that could happen to such a creature, and is already considering a new experiment with other involuntary donors. Simon and Sarah watch silently as Frankenstein starts tidying up the laboratory while pondering who should be first to "donate".

Cast 

 Peter Cushing as Baron Victor Frankenstein / Dr. Carl Victor
 Shane Briant as Dr. Simon Helder
 Madeline Smith as Sarah "Angel" Klauss
 David Prowse as the Creature / Herr Schneider
 John Stratton as Asylum Director Adolf Klauss
 Michael Ward as Transvest
 Elsie Wagstaff as Wild one
 Norman Mitchell as Police Sergeant
 Clifford Mollison as Judge
 Patrick Troughton as Bodysnatcher
 Philip Voss as Ernst
 Christopher Cunningham as Hans
 Charles Lloyd-Pack as Professor Durendel

 Andria Lawrence as Brassy girl
 Lucy Griffiths as Old hag
 Bernard Lee as Tarmut
 Sydney Bromley as Muller
 Jerold Wells as Landlord
 Sheila Dunion as Gerda
 Mischa de la Motte as Twitch
 Norman Atkyns as Smiler
 Victor Woolf as Letch
 Winifred Sabine as Mouse
 Janet Hargreaves as Chatter
 Peter Madden as Coach driver

Production 

This was the sixth and last time that Peter Cushing portrayed the role of Baron Victor Frankenstein, a part he originated in 1957's The Curse of Frankenstein. Cushing had long been known throughout his career for his meticulous attention to detail, even in the planned handling and usage of props. For this film, he helped to design the wig that he wore, but years afterward regretted the outcome, and apparently quipped that it made him look like the American stage and screen star Helen Hayes. Cushing's dedication to the role was never truly dampened, however; even at the age of 59 and in poor health, he still insisted upon performing a stunt which required him to leap from a tabletop onto the hulking creature's back, spinning wildly in circles to subdue the monster gone amok with a sedative.

Apart from an uncredited cameo in the 1967 James Bond spoof Casino Royale, David Prowse made his second appearance as a Frankenstein laboratory creation in this film, his first having been in The Horror of Frankenstein. He is the only actor to have played a Hammer Frankenstein's monster more than once. During the DVD commentary session for this movie, Prowse said that his daily transformation into "the Monster from Hell" went fairly quickly, being able to suit up and pull on the mask in only about 30 minutes – whereas his time in the make-up chair for his previous Hammer monster role typically required several tedious hours.  Prowse and Cushing later costarred in 1977's Star Wars Episode IV - A New Hope as Darth Vader and Grand Moff Tarkin, respectively.

Critical reception 

Frankenstein and the Monster from Hell has received a mixed reception from critics. Of the film, The Hammer Story: The Authorised History of Hammer Films wrote: "Terence Fisher's haunting, melancholy swansong would be an epitaph for Hammer horror itself." Time Out wrote, "Fisher's last film is a disappointment."

The film itself performed poorly at the box office. It was released in certain markets as a double feature with another Hammer film, Captain Kronos – Vampire Hunter.

See also
 Frankenstein in popular culture
 List of films featuring Frankenstein's monster

References

Sources

External links 

 
 

1974 films
1974 horror films
1970s science fiction horror films
British science fiction horror films
Films shot at EMI-Elstree Studios
Frankenstein films
Hammer Film Productions horror films
Films directed by Terence Fisher
Films scored by James Bernard
Films set in Europe
Grave-robbing in film
Paramount Pictures films
1970s English-language films
1970s British films